"Levon" is a song written by English musician Elton John and songwriter Bernie Taupin, and performed by John. It was recorded on 27 February 1971, and was released on John's 1971 album, Madman Across the Water. Backing vocals are provided by Tony Burrows. Paul Buckmaster wrote the orchestral arrangements and directed the orchestra.

The song reached number 24 on the US Billboard Hot 100, and peaked at number six on the Canadian RPM singles chart.

History 
According to Gus Dudgeon, Taupin was inspired by the Band's co-founder, drummer and singer Levon Helm to name the song after him. The Band was apparently John and Taupin's favourite group at the time. In 2013, however, Taupin said that the song is unrelated to Helm. According to fellow Band member, Robbie Robertson, Levon Helm didn't like the song, quoting him as saying "Englishmen shouldn't fuck with Americanisms".

The "Alvin Tostig" mentioned in the song (Levon's father) is, according to Taupin, fictional.

The song was omitted from John's 1974 compilation album Greatest Hits but was included in the U.S. edition of Elton John's Greatest Hits Volume II (1977).

John performed the song for his spring 1972 concert. A portion of the live performance appeared in the bootleg recording releases Scope 72 and Apple Pie.

The song's lyrics refer to the character Levon as being born on Christmas, and John's first son Zachary, who was born on December 25, 2010, has Levon as one of his middle names.

Reception
Author Elizabeth J. Rosenthal in 2001 labelled "Levon" one of Elton John's signature songs. She criticised the orchestra for almost "jeopardizing the simple grandeur of the melody and Elton's chord progressions."

The song peaked at number 24 on Billboard Hot 100 on the week ending 5 February 1972, more than two months after its single release on 29 November 1971.

Charts

Certifications

Personnel 
 Elton John – piano, vocals 
 Brian Dee – harmonium
 Caleb Quaye – electric guitar
 Brian Odgers – bass guitar
 Barry Morgan – drums
 Paul Buckmaster – orchestral arrangements and conductor
 David Katz – orchestra contractor

Notable covers and performances
"Levon" has been covered by several artists, including, Myles Kennedy, Jon Bon Jovi (who covered the song on the tribute album Two Rooms, and says that "Levon" is his favourite song of all time, saying that he looks up to Elton John as his idol) and Canadian rock singer-songwriter Billy Klippert. Mary McCreary recorded a version of "Levon" on her highly regarded LP Jezebel, Shelter Records SR-2110 (1974). Phil Lesh and Friends started playing the song in April 2012, shortly after Levon Helm's death.

Since 1971, John regularly performed this song alongside "Tiny Dancer" on his concert tours in various decades.

References
General
 

Notes

External links
Myles Kennedy SiriusXM Octane performance

1971 singles
1972 singles
Elton John songs
Songs with music by Elton John
Songs with lyrics by Bernie Taupin
Song recordings produced by Gus Dudgeon
Levon Helm
DJM Records singles
Uni Records singles